Felix Cavaliere is the first solo album by Felix Cavaliere, former member, primary songwriter and one of the two lead singers of the Rascals (formerly the Young Rascals).  It was produced by Todd Rundgren.

Track listing
All tracks composed by Felix Cavaliere and Carman Moore.
 "A High Price to Pay"
 "I Am a Gambler"
 "I've Got a Solution"
 "Everlasting Love"
 "Summer in El Barrio"
 "Long Times Gone"
 "Future Train"
 "Mountain Man"
 "Funky Friday"
 "It's Been a Long Long Time"
 "I am Free"
 "A High Price to Pay" (single version) (bonus track found on the 2007 JVC Victor/Bearsville Japan release, catalog #63729)

Personnel
Felix Cavaliere - vocals, piano, organ
Carman Moore - string arrangements
John Siegler, Mervin Bronson - bass
Kermit Moore - cello
Paul Fleisher - saxophone, clarinet
Antonio Jiminez Arana - congas
Jack Scarangella, Kevin Ellman - drums
Elliot Randall, John Hall, Todd Rundgren - guitar
Gualberto Garcia Perez - flamenco guitar
Hank DeVito - pedal steel guitar
Jack Jeffers - baritone horns
Antonio Jiminez Arana, Pablo Rosario - percussion
Kenneth Bichel, Roger Powell - ARP synthesizer
Barry Rogers - trombone
Al Rubin, Larry Spencer, Randy Brecker - trumpet
Alfred Brown, Julien Barber, Selwart Clarke - viola
Noel Da Costa, Raymond Kunicki, W. Sanford Allen - violin
Cissy Houston, Deidre Tuck, Felix Cavaliere, Judy Clay, Renelle Stafford - background vocals
Alex Rutsch - cover

1974 debut albums
Felix Cavaliere albums
Albums produced by Todd Rundgren
Bearsville Records albums
Wounded Bird Records albums